The 16th Antalya Golden Orange Film Festival was a film festival scheduled to be held in Antalya, Turkey, in 1979 which, was cancelled as a protest against  state-imposed censorship.

The competition was cancelled after all the members of the jury and competitors withdrew when the Censorship Committee banned and cut scenes from Ömer Kavur's Yusuf and Kenan, Yavuz Özkan's Railroad and Yavuz Pağda's Travelers and the organizing committee canceled the festival in solidarity. A rule change made the films eligible to compete in the following year's festival but this was also subsequently cancelled.

The awards for this and the following festival, which was also cancelled, re-christened Belated Golden Oranges, were presented at an award ceremony as part of the 48th International Antalya Golden Orange Film Festival, with the recipients chosen from the films originally selected as candidates by the original jury members selected to represent the competition.

The original 1979 Jury was to have consisted of Prof. Özdemir Nutku, Prof. Alim Şerif Onaran, Süreyya Duru, Onat Kutlar, Emre Kongar, Hale Soygazi,  a representative from TRT and a representative from Antalya.

National Feature Film Competition

Belated Golden Orange Awards 
The reconstituted National Feature Film Competition Jury, headed by Prof. Dr. Özdemir Nutku, awarded Belated Golden Oranges in nine categories.
Best Film: Railroad directed by Yavuz Özkan and Yusuf and Kenan directed by Ömer Kavur
Best Director: Yavuz Özkan for Railroad
Best Screenplay: Onat Kutlar & Ömer Kavur for Yusuf and Kenan
Best Music: Arif Erkin for Canal
Best Actress: Sevda Ferdağ for Last Time with You
Best Actor: Fikret Hakan for Railroad
Best Supporting Actress: Sevda Aktolga for The Baby & Railroad
Best Supporting Actor: Kamuran Usluer for Canal
Best Child Artist: Cem Davran for Yusuf and Kenan

Official Selection 
Twelve Turkish films made in the preceding year were selected to compete in the festival's National Feature Film Competition.
Last Time with You directed by Feyzi Tuna
Honor directed by Ümit Efekan
Golden City directed by Orhan Aksoy
Canal directed by Erden Kıral
Citizen Rıza directed by Cüneyt Arkın
Uprising directed by Orhan Aksoy
I Can't Live without You directed by Metin Erksan
Dark Head directed by Korhan Yurtsever
The Baby directed by İhsan Yüce
Travelers directed by Yavuz Pağda
Railroad directed by Yavuz Özkan
Yusuf and Kenan directed by Ömer Kavur

National Short Film Competition

Golden Orange Awards 
Best Short Film: Fatma The Woodworker directed by Süha Arın

See also 
 1979 in film

References

External links
  for the festival

Antalya Golden Orange Film Festival
Antalya Golden Orange Film Festival
Antalya Golden Orange Film Festival